Paskins is a surname. Notable people with the surname include:

 Graeme Paskins (born 1972), English cricketer
 Tony Paskins (1927–2019), Australian rugby league footballer

See also
Parkins
Paskin